Barry Luokkala is the Director of Undergraduate Physics Laboratories in the Department of Physics at Carnegie Mellon University and Program Director for the Pennsylvania Governor's School for the Sciences.  Luokkala was the recipient of the MCS Teaching Award.

PGSS directorship 
The Pennsylvania Governor's School for the Sciences(PGSS) is an academic summer program for gifted high school students from Pennsylvania. Dr. Luokkala has been the director of PGSS since 2001.  Prior to that, he ran both the Physics lab course and team projects for many years.

External links
Official biography

Carnegie Mellon University faculty
Living people
Year of birth missing (living people)